Ryan Becker (born December 23, 1997) is an American football tight end for the Orlando Guardians of the XFL. He played college football at SMU.

College career 
He played for the SMU Mustangs Football team from 2016 to 2019 and finished with 16 Receptions, 198 Receiving Yards, and 5 Touchdowns.

Professional career

Arizona Cardinals 
Arizona signed him as an undrafted free agent following the 2020 NFL Draft. He was waived on August 30, 2020.

Atlanta Falcons 
Becker signed a deal with the Atlanta Falcons on April 13, 2021. On August 20, 2021, he was placed on the injured reserve list due to an undisclosed reason, but was then cut from the list on November 8, 2021 

On February 15, 2022, he re-signed with Atlanta. On May 13, 2022, Becker was released from the Falcons.

Orlando Guardians 
On November 17, 2022, Becker was drafted by the Orlando Guardians of the XFL.

References 

Living people
1997 births
American football tight ends
SMU Mustangs football players
Arizona Cardinals players
Atlanta Falcons players
Orlando Guardians players